Harry Seltzer (March 26, 1919 – July 13, 1990) was an American football player. 

A native of Philadelphia, Seltzer played college football at West Philadelphia High School, Brown Prep, and Morris Harvey. 

He played professional football in the National Football League (NFL) as a fullback for the Detroit Lions. He appeared in six NFL games, one as a starter, during the 1942 season. 

He died in 1990 at Our Lady of Lourdes Medical Center in Camden, New Jersey, at age 71.

References

1919 births
1990 deaths
Charleston Golden Eagles football players
Detroit Lions players
Players of American football from Philadelphia
American football fullbacks